Philippe Thys, who had won the 1913 Tour de France, returned for the 1914 Tour de France and was considered as the favourite, together with his teammate Henri Pélissier. Apart from him six other previous Tour de France winners started the race: Louis Trousselier, Lucien Petit-Breton, Octave Lapize, François Faber, Odile Defraye and Gustave Garrigou. Four more cyclists started the race that would later win a Tour de France: Firmin Lambot, Léon Scieur, Henri Pélissier and Lucien Buysse. This number of 11 former or future Tour de France winners on the start line is a record. In addition, Italian champion Costante Girardengo, started the race, but Girardengo was not yet the champion from 1919 on, and was not the team leader.
In 1914, the first cyclists from Australia started the Tour de France, Don Kirkham and Iddo Munro. They also finished the race, in 17th place and 20th place.

Cyclists

By starting number

References

1914 Tour de France
1914